Jarvis Collegiate Institute is a high school in Toronto, Ontario, Canada. It is named after Jarvis Street where it is located. It is a part of the Toronto District School Board (TDSB). Prior to 1998, it was within the Toronto Board of Education (TBE).

Founded in 1807, it is the oldest active high school in Ontario. Kingston Collegiate and Vocational Institute, founded c. 1792), was the oldest but closed in 2020.

History

Jarvis Collegiate was founded as a private school in 1797. In 1807 the government of Ontario, then known as the British colony of Upper Canada, took over the school and incorporated it in a network of eight new, public grammar schools (secondary schools), one for each of the eight districts of Upper Canada. Of the eight were four key schools:

 Eastern Grammar School or Cornwall Grammar School c. 1806 was located in Cornwall, Ontario
 Western Grammar School c. 1854 or J. C. Patterson Collegiate Institute was located in Windsor, Ontario; school closed in 1973
 Home District Grammar School in Toronto - Jarvis was the grammar school for the Home District, an area covering much of the modern GTA. Its first name was the Home District Grammar School.
 Midland Grammar Schools or Kingston Grammar School c. 1792 then as Midland Grammar School 1807 in Kingston, Ontario

These were the early days of Toronto, when the first parliament buildings were established and the first church and jail were constructed. In fact, it was only fourteen years earlier that Governor John Graves Simcoe arrived at the location on Lake Ontario, home to Mississauga communities and site of important Indigenous trade routes, to lay out the design of the new town he named York.

After the early period 1807-1811, enrollment started at five, rose to twenty, then fell to four - the school gained momentum in 1812 when the redoubtable John Strachan took over as headmaster. In 1839, Strachan became the first Anglican bishop of Toronto, living grandly in a home known as the "Palace" and signing his name (following the "first name / diocese" format customary for Anglican bishops) "John Toronto". He also founded Trinity College.

The original 1807 school building was a shed attached to the headmaster's house. Strachan raised funds for a new two-storey building, completed in 1816 on College Square, a  lot north of St. James' Cathedral, bounded by Richmond, Adelaide, Church and Jarvis Streets. In 1825 the school was renamed the Royal Grammar School. Later the name was changed to Toronto High School. In 1829 it moved to the corner of Jarvis and Lombard Streets. When Upper Canada College was founded in 1829 it shared a building with the Grammar School and for several years the two organizations were essentially unified. UCC eventually moved to its own facilities.

By 1864, the three rooms of the schoolhouse were inadequate for the 150 students, so a new building was constructed on Dalhousie Street, just north of Gould Street, near present-day Toronto Metropolitan University. This was also the year of the founding of the Toronto Grammar School Mental Improvement Society, the predecessor to all school clubs. Later known in schools as "the Lit," the club was a literary and debating society. Originally exclusively for boys, the club began admitting girls in 1893. It was also around this time that the first debates between schools were held in Toronto, the competing schools being Parkdale Collegiate Institute and Harbord Collegiate Institute. In the following decade, once again growing enrollment necessitated a new building. As the school underwent construction between 1870 and 1871, classes were held in a vacant insane asylum at Queen's Park, where the east wing of the legislative buildings are located today.

In 1871 the new building opened at 361 Jarvis Street, just south of College Street, directly in front of Allan Gardens. In 1889, the annexation of Parkdale brought a second high school (Parkdale Collegiate Institute) to the board, precipitating yet another name change from Toronto High School to Jarvis Street High School. The school was given its current name, Jarvis Collegiate Institute, in 1890. In 1924 it moved to its current Collegiate Gothic building designed by architect Charles Edmund Cyril Dyson.

Jarvis Collegiate celebrated its 200th anniversary in 2007.

Principals

In the media
 The 2013 remake of Stephen King's novel, Carrie, was filmed at Jarvis Collegiate Institute as well as Northern Secondary School.

Notable alumni

Torquil Campbell - member of the band Stars
Hector Charlesworth, 1880s - first chairman of the Canadian Radio Broadcasting Corporation
Olivia Chow - Member of Parliament
David Common - CBC news correspondent
J. Miles Dale, 1970s - film producer
Henry Lumley Drayton, 1880s - Minister of Finance, 1919–1921
Sir Lyman Duff - Chief Justice of Canada 1933 - knighted
John Falconbridge, 1880s - dean of Osgoode Hall Law School
William Finlayson - Ontario Minister of Lands and forests, 1930s
Bertha Harmer, grad. 1901 - Textbook of the Principles and Practices of Nursing, standard text in hospitals across North America, translated into several language; organized Yale University's School of Nursing; director of McGill School for Graduate Nurses
George Stewart Henry - Premier of Ontario 1930–34
W. A. Hewitt –  Canadian sports executive and journalist, inductee into the Hockey Hall of Fame
Sir Sam Hughes - JCI teacher, Member of Parliament 1911, Minister of the Militia, knighted 1915
George Ignatieff - Jarvis 1932, Canadian Ambassador to the United Nations, President of U.N. Security Council
Stephan James - actor most notable for his role as Jesse Owens in the 2016 film Race.
David Joseph - basketball coach and former college player
Linda Kash - actress, comedian, radio host
Mia Kirshner - actress and writer
Allan Lawrence - 1940s - Attorney-General of Canada
Sir Ernest MacMillan - notable piano player - performed at JCI in 1905, director of Mendelssohn Choir for 15 years, conductor of Toronto Symphony for 25 years, dean of University of Toronto Faculty of Music; knighted 1935
Chris Makepeace - actor 
Sir Allan McNab - enrolled in Jarvis during its first year, 1807,  Prime Minister of Upper Canada, 1854–1856, knighted for fighting in Rebellion of 1837
Amy Millan -  member of the band Stars
Saul Rae - Jarvis 1931 - Canadian Ambassador to the United Nations
Sara Seager - astrophysicist and planetary scientist
Ernest Thompson Seton, 1870s - artist, naturalist, writer
Omond Solandt - chancellor, University of Toronto
Conn Smythe 1910–1912 - won Stanley Cup 7 times, owner of Toronto Maple Leafs, built Maple Leaf Gardens
Harry Sniderman -  invented the baseball drop pitch
Nicole Stoffman - actress and jazz singer
Roy Thomson - won Jarvis entrance scholarship 1906; left after one year to go to work to help his family, multi-millionaire, owner of newspapers in many countries, given title Lord Thomson of Fleet
Bert Wemp, Toronto mayor 1929
Matei Zaharia - big data computer scientist

Notable staff
John Strachan - significant figure in Family Compact, headmaster of Jarvis 1812–1823, founder of University of Toronto in 1827 when he secured a charter for King's College, first Bishop of Toronto 1836

See also

List of high schools in Ontario

References

External links
Official site
Jarvis Archives and Museum
Ontario Plaques - Jarvis Collegiate Institute

Educational institutions established in 1807
High schools in Toronto
Schools in the TDSB
1807 establishments in Canada